Robert Wilson Adamson (c. 1889 – c. 1952) was a rugby union player who represented Australia.

Adamson, a wing, claimed one international rugby cap for Australia.

References

Australian rugby union players
Australia international rugby union players
1880s births
1952 deaths
Rugby union wings